Smyth's Siding railway station was on the Banbridge Junction Railway which ran from Scarva to Banbridge in Northern Ireland.

History

The station was opened in 1903.

The station closed on 2 May 1955.

References 

Disused railway stations in County Down
Railway stations opened in 1903
Railway stations closed in 1937
1903 establishments in Ireland
1937 disestablishments in Northern Ireland
Railway stations in Northern Ireland opened in the 20th century